Major General Wilford William Whittle (30 August 1892 – 17 June 1964) was a senior officer of the Australian Army who served in both the First and Second World Wars.

Early life and career
Whittle was born on 30 August 1892 in Youanmite, Victoria, and was commissioned into the Siege Artillery Brigade, 36th Heavy Artillery Brigade, on 21 May 1915.

Lieutenant Whittle embarked at Melbourne in July 1915, was wounded in action in December 1916, promoted to captain in November 1917 and was Mentioned in Despatches.

In February 1919, Whittle attended Ordnance Courses at the Ordnance College Woolwich, London, and was subsequently promoted to major.

By 1936 Whittle had been promoted to lieutenant colonel and commanded the Northern Territory garrison from 13 April 1936 to 12 March 1939.  Whittle Street in Larrakeyah Barracks, Darwin, commemorates this command.

Second World War
A commander of various brigades of the Royal Australian Artillery during the early months of the Second World War, Whittle became Deputy Master-General of Ordnance in November 1940, and later Master-General of Ordnance, a post he held until his retirement in 1948. He died in Melbourne. Whittle was granted the honorary rank of major general from 31 December 1948.

References

External links
Wilford Whittle, www.generals.dk

1892 births
1964 deaths
Military personnel from Victoria (Australia)
Australian generals
Australian military personnel of World War I
Australian Army personnel of World War II
People from Victoria (Australia)